HD 148156 b (also known as HIP 80680 b) is an extrasolar planet which orbits the G-type main sequence star HD 148156, located approximately 168 light years away in the constellation Norma. This planet has at least nine-tenths the mass of Jupiter and takes 25 ninths years to orbit the star at a semimajor axis of 2.06 AU. However unlike most other known exoplanets, its eccentricity is not known, but it is typical that its inclination is not known. This planet was detected by HARPS on October 19, 2009, together with 29 other planets.

References 

Exoplanets discovered in 2009
Exoplanets detected by radial velocity
Giant planets
Norma (constellation)